David Russell Hayward (7 June 1920 – 21 April 1945) was an English first-class cricketer active 1939 who played for Middlesex and Oxford University. He was born in Australia; died in Hampshire.

During World War II Hayward was a pilot in the Air Transport Auxiliary. On 21 April 1945 he was flying a Fairchild Argus light aircraft which crashed soon after take-off from RAF Lasham in Hampshire.

References

1920 births
1945 deaths
English cricketers
Middlesex cricketers
Oxford University cricketers
Alumni of New College, Oxford
Air Transport Auxiliary pilots
British civilians killed in World War II